First Bancorp is a bank holding company headquartered in Southern Pines, North Carolina. It operates as First Bank in North and South Carolina. In North Carolina, the company has 94 branches, assets totaling $4.3 billion and deposits of $3.4 billion as of early 2017. First Bancorp has 103 branches, $9.6 billion in assets, and $7.2 billion in deposits.

Description
First Bank is the sixth largest bank in North Carolina. It has 93 branches across North Carolina including branches in Asheville, Charlotte, Winston-Salem, and Wilmington. First Bank also operates six branches in the South Carolina communities of Cheraw, Dillon, Florence, and Latta.

First Bancorp has two additional subsidiaries: Montgomery Data Services, Inc. and First Bank Insurance Services, Inc., which in February 2010 bought The Insurance Center, Inc.

History
Bank of Montgomery began in Troy, North Carolina in 1935 and changed its name to First Bank in February 1985.

On December 16, 1999, First Bancorp agreed to buy First Savings Bancorp Inc., parent of First Savings Bank of Moore County, with six branches and $325 million in assets, for $78.4 million in stock.

On October 23, 2000, First Bancorp announced its purchase of Century Bancorp of Thomasville and its subsidiary Home Savings, founded in 1915. At the time, First Bank had 43 branches in 15 counties. In the Thomasville area First Bank already had branches in High Point and Archdale.

On October 1, 2008, First Bancorp announced the completion of its merger with Great Pee Dee Bancorp, Inc., the holding company of Sentry Bank and Trust, headquartered in Cheraw, South Carolina, with branches in Cheraw and Florence, $221 million in assets, and $155 million in deposits.
 
On June 19, 2009, the Federal Deposit Insurance Corporation closed Cooperative Bank of Wilmington, chartered in 1898 and the second bank in North Carolina to fail in 2009; First Bank took over its 24 branches and $774 million in deposits as of June 22.

In 2011, First Bancorp took over five Bank of Asheville branches with $210 million in assets after state regulators closed the bank.

In 2013, First Bancorp moved its corporate headquarters from Troy, North Carolina to Southern Pines, North Carolina.

On March 4, 2016, First Bancorp and First Community Bank announced a deal in which First Community would sell all three of its branches in Winston-Salem, North Carolina, and one each in Huntersville, North Carolina and Mooresville, North Carolina to First Bancorp. Deposits at these branches totalled $130 million. First Bank would sell seven Virginia branches to First Community. With deposits totalling $150 million, these were located in Abingdon, Blacksburg, Christiansburg, Fort Chiswell, Radford, Salem and Wytheville.

On March 4, 2017, First Bancorp completed a $93 million deal with Carolina Bank Holdings Inc. of Greensboro, North Carolina which would add $706 million in assets, $601 million in deposits, eight branches and three mortgage offices.

A $175 million cash and stock deal with ASB Bancorp Inc. of Asheville, North Carolina completed March 19, 2018 gave First Bancorp an additional $803 million in assets and 13 Asheville Savings Bank branches in Buncombe, Madison, McDowell, Henderson and Transylvania Counties in Western North Carolina.

In its first acquisition since 2017, First Bancorp announced a $314.3 million deal with Dunn, North Carolina-based Select Bancorp Inc. on June 1, 2021. First Bancorp gains $1.8 billion in assets and 22 branches, including branches in South Carolina and Virginia, for a total of $9.6 billion in assets, and reaches fifth place in deposits in North Carolina with $7.2 billion. The deal was completed October 18, 2021.

On January 3, 2023, First Bancorp announced the completion of the $181.1 million purchase of Greenville, South Carolina-based GrandSouth Bancorp. The deal gave First Bancorp $1.3 billion more in assets and eight branches including its first in Charleston, South Carolina and Columbia, South Carolina.

References

External links
  Company website

Banks based in North Carolina
Banks established in 1935
1935 establishments in North Carolina
Companies listed on the Nasdaq